Parliamentary elections were held in São Tomé and Príncipe on 14 May 1980. The country was a one-party state at the time, with the Movement for the Liberation of São Tomé and Príncipe as the sole legal party. It therefore won all 40 seats in the National Assembly.

References

São Tomé
Legislative
Elections in São Tomé and Príncipe
1980
São Tomé